Meer [mɪːr] is a hamlet in the Dutch province of Overijssel. It is located in the municipality of Twenterand, about 2 km west of the town of Den Ham.

Meer is a statistical entity, but the postal authorities have placed it under Den Ham. It was first mentioned in 1333 as Mederen. In 1840, it was home to 242 people.

References

Populated places in Overijssel
Salland
Twenterand